Where two or more persons are liable in respect of the same liability, in most common law legal systems they may either be:

 jointly liable, or
 severally liable, or
 jointly and severally liable.

Joint liability
If parties have joint liability, then they are each liable up to the full amount of the relevant obligation. So if a married couple takes a loan from a bank, the loan agreement will normally provide that they are to be "jointly liable" for the full amount. If one party dies, disappears, or is declared bankrupt, the other individual remains fully liable. Accordingly, the bank may sue all living co-promisors for the full amount.

However, in suing, the creditor has only one cause of action; i.e., the creditor can sue for each debt only once. If, for example, there are three partners, and the creditor sues all of them for the outstanding loan amount and one of them pays the liability, the creditor cannot recover further amounts from the partners who did not contribute to the liability.

Several liability
The converse is several or proportionate liability, where the parties are liable for only their respective obligations. A common example of several liability is in syndicated loan agreements, which will normally provide that each bank is severally liable for its own part of the loan.  If one bank fails to advance its agreed part of the loan to the borrower, then the borrower can sue only that bank, and the other banks in the syndicate have no liability.

Joint and several liability
Under joint and several liability or all sums, a claimant may pursue an obligation against any one party as if they were jointly liable and it becomes the responsibility of the defendants to sort out their respective proportions of liability and payment.  This means that if the claimant pursues one defendant and receives payment, that defendant must then pursue the other obligors for a contribution to their share of the liability.

Joint and several liability is most relevant in tort claims, whereby a plaintiff may recover all the damages from any of the defendants regardless of their individual share of the liability. The rule is often applied in negligence cases, though it is sometimes invoked in other areas of law.

In the United States, 46 of the 50 states have a rule of joint and several liability, although in response to tort reform efforts, some have limited the applicability of the rule. About two dozen have reformed the rule, with several (Alaska, Arizona, Kansas, Utah, Vermont, Oklahoma, and Wyoming) abolishing. In some instances it is abolished except where the defendants "act in concert".

Variations
Some jurisdictions have imposed limits on joint and several liability, but without completely abolishing that doctrine. For example,
 In Ohio only defendants who are responsible for more than 50% of the tortious conduct can be held jointly and severally liable for economic losses. A defendant who bears responsibility for an injury but whose tortious conduct was less than 50% is only responsible for his or her share of the plaintiff's economic loss. Non-economic losses (such as pain and suffering or loss of companionship) can only be assigned proportionately.
 California allows joint and several liability but only for economic damages.
 Hawaii allows joint and several liability for all economic losses but only for non-economic losses when the underlying tort is intentional, related to environmental pollution or selected other classes.

Examples
If Ann is struck by a car driven by Bob, who was served alcohol in Charlotte's bar (and the state has dramshop laws), then both Bob and Charlotte's bar may be held jointly liable for Ann's injuries.  If the jury determines Ann should be awarded $10 million and that Bob was 90% at fault and Charlotte's bar 10% at fault:
Under several or proportionate liability, Bob would have to pay $9 million (90% of $10 million) and Charlotte's bar would have to pay $1 million (10% of $10 million). If Bob does not have any money and is uninsured, Ann will only recover whatever sum(s) Charlotte's bar and/or her insurance provider are able to pay - up to the limit of any liability insurance policy Charlotte may have (plus her own ability to pay, if any) or $1 million, whichever is less.
Under joint liability, Ann may recover the full damages from either of the defendants. If Ann sued Charlotte's bar alone, Charlotte's bar would be liable for the full $10 million despite only being 10% at fault for the injury. If Charlotte's bar had an insurance policy with a liability limit of less than $10 million, the bar would remain liable for any amount over and above the policy limit. Charlotte would have to join Bob as defendant in Ann's suit against her. With joint and several liability, if Charlotte's bar paid the full award of damages, Charlotte's bar could pursue a separate contribution action against Bob for $9 million. Regardless of the outcome of a contribution action, Charlotte's bar would remain liable to Ann for the full $10 million.

Joint and several liability can make a defendant liable for the full amount of damages suffered by a plaintiff even if that defendant bears only slight fault for the injury. For example, if a child is injured due to the negligence of a crossing guard employed by a school district, and a court finds the crossing guard to be 99% at fault for the child's injury and the school district to be only 1% at fault, the school district would be liable to pay 100% of the damages. In contrast, under several liability, if the crossing guard was unable to pay money toward the judgment the most that the injured child could recover would be 1% of the judgment from the school district.

Arguments for and against joint and several liability
Joint and several liability is premised on the theory that the defendants are in the best position to apportion damages amongst themselves. Once liability has been established and damages awarded, the defendants are free to litigate amongst themselves to better divide liability. The plaintiff no longer needs to be involved in the litigation and can avoid the cost of continuing litigation.
As each defendant has contributed to a single result, the injury of the plaintiff, although there may be differences in the character or scope of their duties, it may be argued that their joint contribution to the single result prevents any reasonable division of the damages.
Although one defendant may end up paying more than that defendant tortfeasor's proportionate share of the damages, it is nonetheless thought that it is better for a culpable defendant to overpay that defendant's share of the damages than for the injured plaintiff to be undercompensated for the injury.

Where a financially wealthy party can be named or joined as a defendant, a plaintiff has a greater chance of recovering damages than when the defendants have very limited economic resources or are financially insolvent, or "judgment proof". Opponents of the principle of joint and several liability argue that its use is unfair to many defendants.
 Joint and several liability will lead to cases in which a party who has a very small share of the responsibility for a plaintiff's injury may unfairly shoulder the burden of paying all of the damages.
 When defendants may be held jointly liable, the plaintiff may seek out a defendant with considerable resources ("deep pockets") to add to a case, hoping that the defendant will be found to be even 1% to 2% liable for the injury and thus be obligated to pay the entire judgment.

For example, where an uninsured drunk driver causes an accident that results in injury, the plaintiff may sue an additional defendant, along with the drunk driver, such as suing the state highway department alleging that a highway defect contributed to the accident, hoping that the additional defendant will be found partly responsible.

Microfinance 

In trying to achieve its aim of alleviating poverty, microfinance often lends to group of poor, with each member of the group jointly liable. That means that each member is responsible for ensuring that all the other members of the group repay too. If one member fails to repay, the members of the group are also held in default. Joint liability solves the information and enforcement problems associated with credit markets by encouraging screening, monitoring, costly state verification, and contract enforcement.

See also
Comparative fault
Tort reform
Solidary obligations, civil law equivalent

References

External links
Joint and Several Liability:  50 U.S. State Survey 

Common law legal terminology
Public liability
Tort law legal terminology